Leon Stewart may refer to:
 Leon Stewart (cricketer)
 Leon Stewart (baseball)